Slate Star Codex (SSC) was a blog focused on science, medicine (especially within psychiatry), philosophy, politics, and futurism. The blog was written by Scott Alexander Siskind, a San Francisco Bay Area psychiatrist, under the pen name Scott Alexander.

Slate Star Codex was launched in 2013, and was discontinued on June 23, 2020, as Alexander feared publication of his full name in a New York Times article. , the blog is partially back online, with the content restored but commenting disabled. A successor blog, Astral Codex Ten, was launched on Substack on January 21, 2021.

Alexander also blogged at the rationalist community blog LessWrong.

Notable posts 
The New Yorker states that the volume of content Alexander has written on Slate Star Codex makes the blog difficult to summarize, with an ebook of all posts running to around nine thousand pages. Many posts are book reviews (typically in the social sciences or medicine) or reviews of a topic in the scientific literature. For example, the March 2020 blog post "Face Masks: Much More Than You Wanted To Know" analyzes available medical literature and comes to the conclusion that, contrary to early guidance by the CDC, masks are likely an effective protection measure against COVID-19 for the general public under certain conditions. Some posts are prefaced with a note on their epistemic status, an assessment for Alexander's confidence in the material to follow.

Effective altruism 
Slate Star Codex ranks fourth on a survey of how effective altruists first heard about effective altruism conducted by Rethink Charity, after "personal contact", "LessWrong", and "other books, articles and blog posts", and just above "80,000 Hours." The blog discusses moral questions and dilemmas relevant to effective altruism, such as moral offsets, ethical treatment of animals and trade-offs of pursuing systemic change for charities.

Artificial intelligence 
Alexander regularly wrote about advances in artificial intelligence and emphasized the importance of AI safety research.
 
In the long essay "Meditations On Moloch", he analyzes game-theoretic scenarios of cooperation failure like the prisoner's dilemma and the tragedy of the commons that underline many of humanity's problems and argues that AI risks should be considered in this context.

Controversies and memes 
In "The Toxoplasma of Rage", Alexander discusses how controversies spread in media and social networks. According to Alexander, memes that generate a lot of disagreement spread further, in part because they present an opportunity to members of different groups to send a strong signal of commitment to their cause. For example, he argues that PETA with its controversial campaigns is better known than other animal rights organizations such as Vegan Outreach because of this dynamic. Alexander suggests that activists face a dilemma: messages that reach a greater audience are more likely to generate backlash.

Shiri's scissor
In the short story "Sort By Controversial", Alexander introduces the term "Shiri's scissor" or "scissor statement" to describe a statement that has great destructive power because it generates wildly divergent interpretations that fuel conflict and tear people apart. The term has been used to describe controversial topics widely discussed in social media.

Anti-reactionary FAQ 
The 2013 post "The Anti-Reactionary FAQ" repudiates the work and worldview of the neoreactionary movement, countering in particular the work of Curtis Yarvin, whose reactionary views, according to The New Yorker, include claims about natural racial hierarchies and a desire to restore feudalism. Out of a belief in the superiority of debate over outright bans, Alexander allowed neoreactionary individuals to continue commenting on posts and in "culture war" threads, as well as engaging in extended dialogues with them, such as the thirty-thousand-word FAQ. Alexander's essays on neoreaction have been cited by David Auerbach and Dylan Matthews as explanations of the movement.

Lizardman's Constant 
In the 2013 post "Lizardman's Constant is 4%," Alexander coined the term "Lizardman's Constant," referring to the approximate percentage of responses to a poll, survey, or quiz that are not sincere. He suggested that polls should include a question with an absurd answer as one of the options, so anyone answering choosing that option could be weeded out as a troll.

Reception 
The site was a primary venue of the rationalist community and attracted wider audiences. The New Statesman characterizes it as "a nexus for the rationalist community and others who seek to apply reason to debates about situations, ideas and moral quandaries." The New Yorker describes Alexander's fiction as "delightfully weird" and his arguments "often counterintuitive and brilliant". Economist Tyler Cowen calls Scott Alexander "a thinker who is influential among other writers".

New York Times controversy 
Alexander used his first and middle name alone for safety and privacy reasons, although he had previously published Slate Star Codex content academically under his real name. In June 2020, he deleted all entries on Slate Star Codex, stating that a New York Times technology reporter intended to publish an article about the blog using his full name. Alexander said that the reporter told him that it was newspaper policy to use real names. The Times responded: "We do not comment on what we may or may not publish in the future. But when we report on newsworthy or influential figures, our goal is always to give readers all the accurate and relevant information we can." The Verge cited a source saying that at the time when Alexander deleted the blog, "not a word" of a story about SSC had been written. The Poynter Institute's David Cohn interpreted this event and the furor around it as one incident in a longer conflict over values between the tech and media industries.

Prior to the article's publication, several commentators argued that the Times should not publish Alexander's name without good reason. Writing in National Review, Tobias Hoonhout said that the newspaper had applied its anonymity policy inconsistently. The New Statesman's Jasper Jackson wrote that it was "difficult to see how Scott Alexander's full name is so integral to the NYT story that it justifies the damage it might do to him", but cautioned that such criticism was based solely on Alexander's own statements and that "before we make that call, it might be a good idea to have more than his word to go on." As reported by The Daily Beast, the criticism by Alexander and his supporters caused considerable internal debate among Times staff.

Supporters of the site organized a petition against release of the author's name. The petition collected over six thousand signatures in its first few days, including psychologist Steven Pinker, social psychologist Jonathan Haidt, computer scientist and blogger Scott Aaronson, and philosopher Peter Singer.

According to New Statesman columnist Louise Perry, Scott Alexander wrote that he quit his job and took measures that made him comfortable with revealing his real name, which he published on Astral Codex Ten.

The New York Times published an article about the blog in February 2021, three weeks after Alexander had publicly revealed his name.

References

External links 
 slatestarcodex.com, the original, now discontinued blog
 Astral Codex Ten

Internet properties established in 2013
People associated with effective altruism
Works about effective altruism